The Dark is a 1979 science fiction horror film directed by John Cardos and starring William Devane, Cathy Lee Crosby, Richard Jaeckel, Keenan Wynn, and Casey Kasem.

Cast

William Devane as Roy
Cathy Lee Crosby as Zoe
Richard Jaeckel as Mooney
Keenan Wynn as Moss
Casey Kasem as Pathologist
Jacquelyn Hyde as De Renzy
Warren Kemmerling as Captain Speer
Biff Elliot as Bresler
John Bloom as The Killer
Jay Lawrence as Jim
Vivian Blaine as Courtney
William Derringer as Herman
Russ Marin as Dr. Baranowski
Roberto Contreras as Bartender
Vernon Washington as Henry
Erik Howell as Antwine
Ron Iglesias as Rudy
William Lampley as The Young Man
Sandra Walker McCully as Carhop
Ken Minyard as Sportscaster
Valla Rae McDade as Camille
Monica Peterson as Mrs. Lydell
Penny Ann Phillips as Zelza
Jeffrey Reese as Randy
Kathy Richards as Shelly

Production
Tobe Hooper was hired by Film Ventures International to direct the film.  However, since Hooper fell behind schedule, the producers fired him and replaced him with Cardos.

Reception
Roger Ebert awarded the film one and a half stars.  Jim Knipfel of Den of Geek awarded the film two stars out of five.

References

External links
 
 

American science fiction horror films
1979 horror films
Films directed by John Cardos
American exploitation films
1970s English-language films
1970s American films